From the Choirgirl Hotel is the fourth studio album by American musician Tori Amos. It was released on May 5, 1998 on Atlantic Records. The album was Amos' first to be recorded at her own Martian Engineering Studios in Cornwall, England and was self-produced, with the mixing being handled by longtime collaborators Marcel van Limbeek and Mark Hawley, whom she had married in early 1998.

In contrast with the sparse, minimalist sound of Amos' previous albums, From the Choirgirl Hotel features a greater emphasis on full band arrangements. Additionally, the album sees Amos integrate elements of electronica, trip hop, and dance music. The album marks the first appearance of Matt Chamberlain on drums; he has gone on to contribute to the majority of Amos' albums ever since.

From the Choirgirl Hotel was commercially and critically successful. It peaked at number 5 in the US, becoming Amos' second straight top ten album in her home country, and reached number 6 in the UK. "Spark", the album's lead single, reached number 49 on the Billboard Hot 100, her highest position on the chart. Two further singles—"Jackie's Strength" and "Raspberry Swirl" / "Cruel"—were released, with the former reaching the top of the US Hot Dance Club Play chart. The album garnered two Grammy nominations – one for Best Alternative Music Performance, and another for Best Female Rock Vocal Performance (for "Raspberry Swirl"). Amos promoted the album with the "Plugged '98" tour, her first with a full band. Performances from the tour were included on the live disc of her next release, To Venus and Back.

Album description
The album began recording in September 1997, with mastering complete by early February 1998. Following the trend set by 1996's Boys for Pele, Amos allowed several songs from the album to be remixed. Remixes of both "Raspberry Swirl" and "Jackie's Strength" were club hits. The album's theme dealt very closely with the first two in Amos's series of three miscarriages between 1996 and 1999.

Thematically and conceptually, the "choirgirl hotel" of the title refers to the fictional, imaginary place where the songs "live". Amos pointed out that although the songs are recorded, they are also alive themselves – they can be re-modeled and reshaped in concert. Amos imagined the songs as living their own lives, all checking into the "choirgirl hotel" (i.e. the album) but living separate lives. In the artwork, Amos included a hand-drawn map detailing the stomping ground of these songs.

The album artwork was created by the UK-based photographer, Katerina Jebb. The artwork features full-body color photocopies of Amos (in various couture outfits) as scanned by a human-sized photocopier.

Critical reception

"The kookiness isn't dominant, she's stopped the attention-seeking lyrics almost completely and, yes, her pianos don't try to be guitars too often," enthused John Aizlewood in Q. "At last, she's putting the songs first, and the band-led From the Choirgirl Hotel is, by any reasonable yardstick, a glorious coming of age."

Track listing

Notes
The track 'Merman' was released as a pre-order bonus track*

B-sides
Like Amos's previous Atlantic albums, several songs recorded during the From the Choirgirl Hotel sessions were released as B-sides, and introduced into Amos's live performance repertoire. "Cooling," "Never Seen Blue," and "Beulah Land" were originally written and recorded for 1996's Boys for Pele album. Several tracks from a demo CD for the album leaked online in 2010, including "Violet's Eyes". Parts of this song evolved into "Almost Rosey" and "Miracle" from 2007's American Doll Posse.

Personnel
 Tori Amos – keyboards, vocals
 Steve Caton – acoustic and electric guitar; mandolin on "Black-Dove (January)"
 George Porter Jr., Justin Meldal-Johnsen – bass
 Matt Chamberlain – drums; marimba on "Cruel"
 Andy Gray – programming
with:
 Stewart Boyle – guitar on "Northern Lad"
 Willy Porter – guitar on "Playboy Mommy"
 Al Perkins – steel guitar on "Playboy Mommy"
 Sinfonia of London – on "Jackie's Strength", conducted by David Firman, strings arranged by John Philip Shenale

Charts

Weekly charts

Year-end charts

Certifications

References

1998 albums
Tori Amos albums
Atlantic Records albums